Malia Paseka (born 30 August 2000) is a Tongan Taekwondo athlete who made her Olympic debut at the 2020 Summer Olympics in Tokyo. She served as the opening ceremony flag bearer alongside Pita Taufatofua.

Sports career 
In 2019, Paseka won bronze in the women’s -62 kg and gold in the team event at the Pacific Games in Apia, Samoa, the first step in her path towards Olympic qualification.

2020 Summer Olympics 
In February 2020, Paseka secured her spot in the Olympics after winning gold in the women’s 67 kg division at the Olympic Qualifier tournament on Australia’s Gold Coast. Her appearance at the 2020 Summer Olympics marked the first time a female Taekwondo athlete represented Tonga at the Olympic Games. She also became the ninth female athlete to represent Tonga in any sport at the Olympic Games. Paseka lost in her debut by a technical knockout, after Lauren Williams kicked her in the head and the referees stopped the contest. Williams going to the final sent Paseka to the repechage, lost to Hedaya Wahba.

References

External links
 

Tongan female taekwondo practitioners
Taekwondo practitioners at the 2020 Summer Olympics
Living people
2000 births
Olympic taekwondo practitioners of Tonga